New World is a New Zealand full-service supermarket chain. Each store is independently owned and operated, and is part of one of two Foodstuffs' co-operatives (Foodstuff North Island and Foodstuffs South Island).  Other independently owned and operated members of the Foodstuffs co-operatives include Pak'nSave and Four Square stores.

History 

Founded in 1963, New World was the first American-style full-service supermarket brand of Foodstuffs, and the second in New Zealand (after Foodtown). As of December 2021, there are more than 140 New World supermarkets across the North and South Islands. New World has been a member of the Fly Buys program since the program started in September 1996.

In early 2003 New World helped introduce Superbank, a completely electronic banking network aimed at saving customers money. While New World Supermarkets had much advertising for the service in their stores, Superbank had no physical services inside the store. In August 2006 it was announced that after heavy losses Superbank would be shut down and have its portfolio sold to GE Capital.

Historically, New World used a coupon saver system. This was replaced in 2014 in South Island stores by the Clubcard system; this was phased into North Island stores in 2016.

Brands

New World

New World is the brand name of the chain's full-service supermarkets, selling groceries and liquor. The first store opened in 1963. There are 142 stores under this brand, including 26 in Auckland.

New World Metro

New World Metro is a brand of smaller supermarkets in central city locations, also selling groceries and liquor. The first store, in Wellington CBD, opened in 2002. There are currently four stores, in Wellington CBD, Wellington railway station, Auckland CBD and Takapuna, Auckland.

New World Fresh Collective

New World Fresh Collective is a brand of small supermarkets in Auckland, focusing on fresh produce, premium products and meal kits. The first store opened in Mairangi Bay in 2017, then others in Mount Albert and Glen Innes. Foodstuffs planned to open ten stores, but the Mount Albert store is the only one still operating.

Private label brands
New World has the house brand Pams, which has been around since 1937 – owned by parent company Foodstuffs and are also available across their retailer's cooperative.

Gallery

See also

References

External links

Supermarkets of New Zealand
Retail companies established in 1963
New Zealand companies established in 1963